Sebastián Darío Morquio Flores (born 22 January 1976 in Montevideo) is a Uruguayan footballer playing for Deportivo Español.

External links
 
 Player profile 
 Uralan Squad 2003 at RSSSF.com
 Apertura 2002 Statistics at Terra.com.ar 

1976 births
Living people
Uruguayan footballers
Uruguayan expatriate footballers
Association football defenders
Club Nacional de Football players
Montevideo Wanderers F.C. players
C.A. Progreso players
Club Atlético Huracán footballers
El Porvenir footballers
Curicó Unido footballers
Club Alianza Lima footballers
Aldosivi footballers
FC Elista players
Deportivo Español footballers
Atlético de Rafaela footballers
Russian Premier League players
Chilean Primera División players
Argentine Primera División players
Expatriate footballers in Argentina
Expatriate footballers in Chile
Expatriate footballers in Peru
Expatriate footballers in Russia